Pachythecus rubrocupreus is a species of beetle in the family Carabidae, the only species in the genus Pachythecus.

References

Pterostichinae